Meropachyinae is a subfamily of leaf-footed bugs in the family Coreidae. There are at least 50 described species in Meropachyinae, recorded from the Americas.

Meropachyinae has been commonly spelled "Meropachydinae" in the past, but "Meropachyinae" is now considered correct.

Genera
These 27 genera belong to the subfamily Meropachyinae:

 Acocopus Stål, 1864
 Alcocerniella Brailovsky, 1999
 Allopeza Bergroth, 1912
 Badilloniella Brailovsky & Barrera, 2001
 Diariptus Stål, 1860
 Egerniella Brailovsky, 2000
 Esparzaniella Brailovsky & Barrera, 2001
 Flavius Stål, 1862
 Gracchus Stål, 1862
 Himellastella Brailovsky & Barrera, 1998
 Hirilcus Stål, 1862
 Juaristiella Brailovsky, 1999
 Larraldiella Brailovsky, 1999
 Lycambes Stål, 1862
 Marichisme Kirkaldy, 1904
 Merocoris Perty, 1833
 Meropachys Burmeister, 1835
 Meropalionellus Brailovsky, 2009
 Paralycambes Kormilev, 1954
 Peranthus Stål, 1868
 Possaniella Brailovsky, 1999
 Romoniella Brailovsky & Barrera, 2001
 Salamancaniella Brailovsky & Luna, 2000
 Serranoniella Brailovsky & Barrera, 2001
 Soteloniella Brailovsky, 1999
 Spathophora Amyot & Serville, 1843
 Zettelniella Brailovsky, 2009

References

Further reading

 
 
 

 
Coreidae
Articles created by Qbugbot